Ștefan Costel Grigorie (born 31 January 1982) is a Romanian former footballer who played as a midfielder.

Club career
Ștefan Grigorie was born on 31 January 1982 in Segarcea, Romania, starting his career at Universitatea Craiova, making his Divizia A debut on 2 June 1999 in a 1–0 loss against CSM Reșița. He was loaned for a half of year in 2000 at neighboring Craiova team, Electro in Divizia B, afterwards returning at Universitatea where he made his European competitions debut in the 2001 Intertoto Cup, scoring five goals in four appearances. Grigorie was transferred at Dinamo București, helping the club win the 2003–04 Divizia A, being used by coach Ioan Andone in 25 matches in which he scored 8 goals. During his four seasons spent with The Red Dogs in which developed an appetite for goals, scoring 30 goals in 101 Divizia A matches, he also won three Cupa României, scoring the only goal from the 2005 final against Farul Constanța, won a Supercupa României and helped the team eliminate Everton with 5–2 on aggregate, reaching the group stage of the 2005–06 UEFA Cup. In the summer of 2006 he was bought together with Dan Alexa from Dinamo by Politehnica Timișoara where he spent only one season, not accommodating, being transferred at Rapid București in exchange for Ionel Ganea. He spent 6 seasons with the Giuleștenii, playing a total of 136 Divizia A matches, scoring 13 goals and won the 2007 Supercupa României. In 2013, Grigorie had his first and only experience outside Romania, playing for half of year in the Cypriot First Division at Apollon Limassol, afterwards returning to play in Divizia A for three years and a half at FC Brașov, Concordia Chiajna and CSMS Iași. He ended his career by spending two seasons in Liga II at FC Brașov and UTA Arad. Ștefan Grigorie has a total of 368 Divizia A matches in which he scored 59 goals and 38 appearances with 5 goals scored in European competitions (including 4 appearances and 5 goals in the Intertoto Cup).

International career
Ștefan Grigorie played two friendly games for Romania, making his debut under coach Anghel Iordănescu on 12 February 2003, when he came as a substitute and replaced Mirel Rădoi in the 82nd minute of a 2–1 victory against Slovakia. His second and final appearance for the national team was under coach Victor Pițurcă on 16 August 2006 in a 2–0 victory against Cyprus.

International stats

Honours
Dinamo București
Divizia A: 2003–04
Cupa României: 2002–03, 2003–04, 2004–05
Supercupa României: 2005
Rapid București
Supercupa României: 2007

References

External links

1982 births
Living people
People from Segarcea
Romanian footballers
Romania international footballers
Association football midfielders
Liga I players
Liga II players
FC U Craiova 1948 players
FC Dinamo București players
FC Politehnica Timișoara players
FC Rapid București players
FC Brașov (1936) players
CS Concordia Chiajna players
FC Politehnica Iași (2010) players
Cypriot First Division players
Apollon Limassol FC players
FC UTA Arad players
Romanian expatriate footballers
Expatriate footballers in Cyprus
Romanian expatriate sportspeople in Cyprus